The Journal of World-Systems Research (JWSR) is a biannual, open access, peer-reviewed academic journal in the field of world-systems analysis, established in 1995 by founding editor Christopher Chase-Dunn at the Institute for World-System Research at the University of California at Riverside. The journal's current editor-in-chief is Andrej Grubačić.

The journal was one of the first online, peer-reviewed academic journals, published originally as an online archive of scholarly papers accessed using the Gopher (protocol).

The journal describes its purpose as being:

References

External links

Sociology journals
Publications established in 1995
English-language journals
Biannual journals
Globalization-related journals
World systems theory

Open access journals
American Sociological Association academic journals